Epistrophy, sub-titled The Last Concert, is a live album by saxophonist Charlie Rouse which was recorded in 1988 in San Francisco and released on Orrin Keepnews' Landmark label the following year.

Reception

The AllMusic review by Scott Yanow stated "Although he had an extensive career, tenor saxophonist Charlie Rouse is best remembered for his decade (1960-1970) as a member of the Thelonious Monk Quartet. It is only right that the last time that he picked up his horn was for a Monk tribute concert. This historic event, originally released by Landmark and reissued with one extra selection on a 1997 32 Jazz CD, finds Rouse in prime form despite the fact that he had just seven weeks to live (before passing on from lung cancer). The date was special from the start, with producer Orrin Keepnews getting Rouse to say a few words to the audience about his time with Monk. ... A historic occasion that resulted in near-classic music; highly recommended".

Duck Baker of Jazz Times wrote: "The sentimental interest of this last date... is matched by music of considerable value. Rouse knew his time was short, and some of his playing... is very emotional. Kudos to George Cables and Jessica Williams... for very fine and appropriately monastic piano work."

Track listing
All compositions by Thelonious Monk except where noted.
 Some Words About Monk – 3:11
 "Nutty" – 6:55
 "Ruby, My Dear" – 7:46
 "Blue Monk" – 9:11
 "In Walked Bud" – 9:27
 "´Round Midnight" – 16:16
 "Epistrophy" (Monk, Kenny Clarke) – 11:03

Personnel
Charlie Rouse - tenor saxophone (tracks 2-4, 6 & 7)
Don Cherry – trumpet (tracks 6 & 7)
Buddy Montgomery – vibraphone (tracks 5-7)
George Cables (tracks 2, 3 & 5-7), Jessica Williams (track 4) – piano
 Jeff Chambers – bass (tracks 2-7)
Ralph Penland – drums (tracks 2-7)

References

Landmark Records live albums
Charlie Rouse live albums
1989 live albums
Albums produced by Orrin Keepnews